Amalendu Biswas (19251987) was a Bangladeshi stage actor. Calling Jatra Samrat, he specialized in jatra pala genre. He won Sequence of Merit Award by Bangladesh Shilpakala Academy in 1980. He was awarded Ekushey Padak by the Government of Bangladesh posthumously in 1989.

Career
Biswas started his career at the British Royal Airforce. He left the service during World War II and formed a jatra troupe Charanika Jatra Shamaj. He performed with the troupe Natta Company while he was in Kolkata.

Personal life
Biswas was married to Jyotsna Biswas. They had a daughter Aruna Biswas.

Legacy
In 2003, annual Amalendu Biswas Memorial Award was launched by Bangladesh Jatra Shilpa Unnayan Parishad (BJSUP) to award notable theater actors.

Works
 Hitler
 Janoar
 Sirajuddaulah
 Ekti Paisa 
 Michel Modhushudan

References

1925 births
1987 deaths
Bengali Hindus
Bangladeshi Hindus
Bangladeshi male stage actors
Recipients of the Ekushey Padak
20th-century Bangladeshi male actors
People from Yangon
Date of birth missing
Date of death missing